"Nothing Is Impossible" is a song by Australian contemporary worship band Planetshakers. It was released on August 9, 2011, as the lead single from their live album, Nothing Is Impossible (2011).
The song also appeared on the album on the Planetshakers Kids album Nothing Is Impossible (2013), on the album Nada Es Imposible (2014), on the album Outback Worship Sessions, on the album Momentum (Live in Manila) (2016), on the album Heaven on Earth, Part 3, on the album Heaven on Earth, on the album Deeper (2009) and it also appears in the album Beautiful Saviour (2008).  The song was written by Joth Hunt.

Commercial performance 
In May 2014, Planetshakers band also receives an invitation from James Robinson of the American television program Life Today with James Robison to sing the song live. Planetshakers on November 10, 2015 visited the church El Lugar de Su Presencia in Colombia to sing the song "Nada Es Imposible" in Spanish.
In October 2016, on invitation from Brian Johnson, the band visited Bethel Church in Redding, California where the band performed the song Nothing Is Impossible live.

Composition and genre
The song was written by Joth Hunt. 

In 2011, Planetshakers released the song Nothing Is Impossible, the song was recorded live, Joth Hunt featuring Israel Houghton leading the worship song, from the album Nothing Is Impossible (2011). 

In 2014, Planetshakers released the song Nada Es Imposible, the song was recorded in studio, Joth Hunt featuring Lucía Parker leading the worship song, from the album Nada Es Imposible (2014), the band's first album in Spanish.

In the 2015, Planetshakers released the song Nothing Is Impossible in a pop-style, songwriter Joth Hunt added some more lyrics to the song, featured on the album Outback Worship Sessions.

In the 2016, Planetshakers released Nothing Is Impossible in an electronic style, featured on the album Momentum (Live in Manila).

In the 2018, Planetshakers released Nothing Is Impossible the first remix in (EDM Remix) an electronic dance style, appears in the album Heaven on Earth.

Critical reception
Russ Hutto, for The Worship Community, says, the track Nothing is Impossible. It is a great song, and features Israel Houghton. The song has a strong classic U2 guitar vibe which really drives the song. The Blend between the vocals of Israel Houghton and Planetshakers frontman Joth Hunt really adds to the dynamic of this song. This is one that would work in any congregation and really builds the faith of the people in your congregation.

Music videos
The official music video for the song was released on June 17, 2015 and has garnered over 3 million views as of April 2021.

Covers and renditions
Nothing Is Impossible has been translated and interpreted in many evangelical churches around the world. This song has been covered by a number of Christian music artists including Gateway Worship led by the worship singer Matt Birkenfeld, Israel & New Breed, Marco Barrientos, Lakewood Church, El Lugar de Su Presencia among other artists.

On April 12, 2011, Indiana Bible College released the song Nothing Is Impossible from the album Your Name.
On July 25, 2012, the Mexican Christian singer Marco Barrientos, released the Planetshakers song in Spanish Nada Es Imposible for the album "Ilumina" and the album Legado de Adoración (2016).
On February 5, 2013 the band Quatro por Um released the song Nothing Is Impossible from the album Nada é Impossível.
On March 23, 2014 the band Gateway Worship released the album My Sole Pursuit, on the album they include the song Nothing Is Impossible.
In 2015 the colombian band of Su Presencia released Nada Es Imposible in an acoustic version.

Chart performance
Nothing Is Impossible also topped the corresponding Christian charts by  Billboard.

References

2011 singles
2011 songs
Christian songs
Gospel songs
Contemporary Christian songs
Songs written by Joth Hunt
Planetshakers songs
Planetshakers Ministries International singles